Zakhar Dmitrievich Olsufiev (24 March 1773 – 20 March 1835) was a Russian infantry Lieutenant General during the reigns of tsars Paul I and Alexander I.

In 1805 he commanded a brigade at Austerlitz and in 1807 he was wounded at Eylau and Heilsberg. In 1812 he commanded the 17th Division at Borodino and Vyazma. After being promoted to head the 9th Infantry Corps, he fought at the Katzbach and Leipzig in 1813 and at Brienne and La Rothière in 1814. On 10 February 1814, he commanded a 5,000-man Russian infantry corps during the Battle of Champaubert in an attempt to stop a 30,000-man army under Napoleon. His small corps was effectively destroyed and he became a French prisoner of war.

References

Russian generals
Russian commanders of the Napoleonic Wars
1773 births
1835 deaths